Polla is a town and comune of the province of Salerno in the Campania region of south-west Italy. In 2011 its population was 5,327.

History
The area in which the town is located was settled since prehistoric times, as evidenced by finds of bones and ceramic in a nearby cave. During the Ancient Roman domination it was built a forum in today's quarter of San Pietro.

Geography
Polla is in the north of the Vallo di Diano, close to the Alburni mountain range and is crossed by the Tanagro river. It borders with the municipalities of Atena Lucana, Auletta, Brienza (PZ), Caggiano, Corleto Monforte, Pertosa, Sant'Angelo Le Fratte (PZ) and Sant'Arsenio.

Demographics

Famous residents
Costantino Catena (b. 1969), pianist
Edoardo Monteforte (b. 1849), painter
Nicola Peccheneda (1725-1804), Rococo painter

Twin towns
 Steinenbronn (Germany)

See also
Vallo di Diano
Cilento
Pertosa Caves
Cilentan dialect

References

External links

 Polla official website

Cities and towns in Campania
Localities of Cilento